Paul Hoenscher (25 March 1887 in Klein Neudorf,  — 16 February 1937) was a German politician of the National Socialist German Worker's Party (NSDAP). He was seated in the Reichstag from March 1933 to his death in February 1937.

Biography 
Hoenscher was the son of an independent farmer. He attended a Volksschule between 1884 and 1887 and a Gymnasium between 1887 and 1900. Then he had a vocational training in several agricultural businesses until 1908. After serving in the 22nd Infantry Regiment between 1908 and 1910, he became an independent farmer.

As a member of the 51st Reserve Infantry Regiment, Hoenscher fought in World War I from 1914 to 1918 and was awarded the 2nd-class Iron Cross and the Silesian Eagle.

In the 1920s, he joined the NSDAP. He assumed several functions within the party; he was a District Peasant Leader (Kreisbauernführer) among others. In the March 1933 parliamentary election, he was elected to the Reichstag in the 9th constituency (Oppeln) for the NSDAP. He was re-elected in November 1933 and in 1936 and retained his seat until his death in February 1937.

Bibliography

External links 
 

1887 births
People from Silesia
Recipients of the Iron Cross, 2nd class
German Army personnel of World War I
Nazi Party politicians
Members of the Reichstag of the Weimar Republic
Members of the Reichstag of Nazi Germany
1937 deaths